The Cariri Velhos belt is a belt of rocks in Brazil that were deformed and metamorphosed in the Early Neoproterozoic.

The Cariri Velhos belt lies intercalated in a mosaic with various Brasiliano cycle belts in the Borborema Province, a geologic province in Northeastern Brazil. The belt includes a series of orthogneisses, metavolcanic and metasedimentary rocks. It is not known if the plate tectonic events that led to the formation of the belts are related to the assembly of the supercontinent Rodinia.

References 

Orogenies of South America
Geography of Alagoas
Geography of Paraíba
Geography of Pernambuco
Geology of Brazil
Neoproterozoic orogenies
Neoproterozoic South America
Precambrian South America